Unguiculella is a genus of lichen-forming fungi in the family Cordieritidaceae. A total of 17 species fall under this genus.

Species
Unguiculella aggregata 
Unguiculella caespitosa 
Unguiculella eurotioides 
Unguiculella foliicola 
Unguiculella globosa 
Unguiculella hamulata 
Unguiculella incarnatina 
Unguiculella jamaicensis 
Unguiculella meliolicola 
Unguiculella nectriiphila 
Unguiculella oregonensis 
Unguiculella robergei 
Unguiculella sarothamni 
Unguiculella tityri

References

Leotiomycetes
Leotiomycetes genera
Taxa described in 1906
Taxa named by Franz Xaver Rudolf von Höhnel